Geek Pride Day is an initiative to promote geek culture, celebrated annually on May 25.

Origins
Tim McEachern organized unconnected events called Geek Pride Festival and/or Geek Pride Day 1998 to 2000 at a bar in Albany, New York, which are sometimes seen as a prelude to Geek Pride Day.

Dick Morley, a "father" of the PLC, organised Geek Pride Days at The Barn, his retreat in New Hampshire, as early as 2001. He describes it in his book, Techshock – Future under repair (ISA, 2009). He held them on the longest day of the year and he wrote of Geek Pride Day (Or Outing Engineers in the Bush!) on page 19.

In 2006, the Spanish blogger Germán Martínez known online as señor Buebo organized the first celebration. The day was celebrated for the first time in Spain and on the Internet, drawing attention from mainstream media. The biggest concentration took place in Madrid, where 300 geeks demonstrated their pride together with a human Pac-Man. A manifesto was created to celebrate the first Geek Pride Day, which included a list of the basic rights and responsibilities of geeks.

2008
In 2008, Geek Pride Day was officially celebrated in the U.S., where it was heralded by numerous bloggers, coalescing around the launch of the Geek Pride Day website.  Math author, Euler Book Prize winner, and geek blogger John Derbyshire announced that he would be appearing in the Fifth Avenue parade on the prime number float, dressed as number 57.

Continued spread

In 2010 the festival spread further, taking in cities as diverse as Halifax, Nova Scotia; Budapest, Hungary; Tel Aviv, Israel; Timișoara, Romania and San Diego, California. In 2013, a Geek Pride parade was held in Gothenburg, Sweden, and it was decided that it would be an annual event.

See also
Towel Day – celebrated on the same date since 2001
Star Wars Day
Pi Day
Glorious Twenty-fifth of May

References

External links
Orgullofriki.com (Spanish)

May observances
Nerd culture
Recurring events established in 2006
International observances
Unofficial observances